Vintage Quays is the thirty-fourth studio album by King Creosote, released in 2005.

Track listing
Tease     
Insect Bites       
CA M'ennerve       
Queen Of Tarts       
Dischord At Second Midnight       
Harvest Time For It All       
Voices      
Carbon Dating Agent      
Deranged, Derailed And Derided       
Asylum Clothing     
The Millstone       
A Final Story     
Toxins

2005 albums
King Creosote albums